Events in the year 1886 in China.

Incumbents
Emperor: Guangxu Emperor (12th year)

Births
 Fang Shengdong (1886–1911) revolutionary figure

References

 
Years of the 19th century in China